Cerros Bravos-Barros Negros is a volcanic complex in the Maricunga Belt in Chile.

Cerros Bravos may have collapsed towards the northeast in its history, ignimbrites may have formed during this collapse. The bulk of the surface area of the complex is formed by lavas; ignimbrites or tuffs and lava domes are subordinate. The Esperanza lava dome complex is associated with the volcanoes, it was constructed on the northeast flank of Cerros Bravos. The volcanoes are limited towards the northeast by the Quebrada Salitral and to the southwest by the Quebrada La Cienaga fault. The first of these faults directed the formation of the Esperanza domes.

Rock compositions range from rhyodacite over dacite to andesite. Minerals identified include biotite, hornblende and pyroxene. Epithermal gold and silver is found at Esperanza. In 1993, gold reserves of 120 m.t. and silver reserves of 7,200 m.t. were estimated. These were mostly formed by acid sulfate alteration.

Volcanism at Cerros Bravos-Barros Negros commenced 26-22 million years ago, and were the only stratovolcanoes of the Maricunga Belt from that time. Small ignimbrites formed the first stage of activity, followed lava flows and eventually lava domes. The Esperanza dome complex was emplaced later between 23.2 ± 1.4 to 19.3 ± 0.7 million years ago, accompanied by Plinian eruptions.

References

Sources

External links 
 Epithermal silver-gold minerallzation at the Esperanza area, Maricunga Belt, High Andes of northern Chile
 Estrato volcanes y domos coalescendentes del Oligoceno superior-Mioceno inferior en la franja de Maricunga: los sistemas cerros Bravos-Esperanza y la Coipa 
 Aspectos mineralógicos y termométricos del prospecto Esperanza-Cerros Bravos, Maricunga, III región, Chile

Oligocene volcanoes
Miocene volcanoes
Volcanoes of Atacama Region